Mari Hernandez (1979) is a photographer known for her self-portraits that reflect Chicana cultural identity. She is a co-founder of Más Rudas, a Chicana artist collective.

Biography 
Mari Hernandez was born in San Antonio, Texas. Hernandez began exploring her own art aesthetic after visiting murals at the San Antonio Cultural Arts Center. She received her Bachelor’s degree in English Literature at the University of Texas at San Antonio.

Involvement 
Hernandez is one of the co-founders of the group, Más Rudas (2009 - 2015). Mas Rudas is a group of four Chicana artists: Mari Hernandez, Ruth Leonela Buentello, Sarah Castillo, and Kristin Gamez. The artists aim to represent their life experiences as Chicana women through art, videos, photography and installation.

Awards 
She received a  Joan Mitchell Foundation Emerging Artist Grant in 2017 as well as a National Association of Latino Arts and Cultures Fund for the Arts grant.

Photography 
 What Remains is a photo series created in 2018 that depicts the connection between one's physiognomy and identity.
 As Julia Pastrana, is a photo series inspired by the life of Julia Pastrana. This photo series was created in 2013.
 El Lenguaje, a triptych created in 2021, is about language's impact on cultural identity.

References

External links 
 
https://www.joanmitchellfoundation.org/mari-hernandez

Wikipedia Student Program
1979 births
Living people
21st-century American women artists
21st-century women photographers
American people of Mexican descent
Artists from Los Angeles
Chicana feminism
University of Texas alumni